Service lapel button may refer to:

 Honorable Service Lapel Button, awarded to U.S. military service members who were discharged under honorable conditions during World War II
 Gold Star Lapel Button, issued to the direct next of kin family members of service members who died in World War I and World War II and other hostilities in which the Armed Forces has been engaged
 Any service lapel button authorized under Title 36 of the United States Code, Subtitle I—Patriotic and National Observances and Ceremonies, Chapter 9, § 901

See also
 Service flag